Eutomostethus is a genus of sawflies belonging to the family Tenthredinidae, subfamily Blennocampinae.

Species
Species within this genus include:
 Eutomostethus ephippium (Panzer, 1798)
 Eutomostethus gagathinus (Klug, 1814)
 Eutomostethus luteiventris (Klug, 1814)
 Eutomostethus nigrans Blank & Taeger, 1998
 Eutomostethus punctatus (Konow, 1887)

References

Tenthredinidae